Setoglyphus is a genus of mites in the family Acaridae.

Species
 Setoglyphus hexaedra (Mahunka, 1973)
 Setoglyphus variosetosus S. Mahunka, 1979

References

Acaridae